Halsema Highway (also known as the ,  or Mountain Trail) is a national secondary highway in the Philippines. Situated within the Cordillera Central range in northern Luzon, it stretches from the city limit of Baguio to the municipality of Bontoc.

It also covers four Mountain Province towns (Bauko, Sabangan, Bontoc, and Sagada). The road splits into two upon reaching the village of Dantay, in Bontoc. One road leads to downtown Bontoc, while the other leads to the town of Sagada,  farther from the junction.

The highway forms part of National Route 204 (N204) of the Philippine highway network.

History
The highway was named after an American engineer, named Eusebius Julius Halsema, who served as the mayor of Baguio from 1920 to 1937. Under Halsema's term, its construction commenced in 1922 with the help of locals and was completed in 1930 as a foot trail.

Halsema Highway has been a crucial part of Cordillera's history and transportation. It's the only existing link between Baguio and Cordillera's most remote areas. It is the only route that vegetable farmers take to distribute vegetables in Baguio's markets.

Hazards
Parts of the highway are dangerous, especially during the rainy season, when landslides are common and asphalted portions become slippery.

In March 2013, List25 included the highway at #9 in its 25 Most Dangerous Roads in the World.

It was shown in Discovery World's show, Hot Roads - World's Most Dangerous Roads.

See also
Halsema Highroad Point

References

Roads in Ifugao
Roads in Benguet
Roads in Mountain Province
Baguio